The 1996 season was the Green Bay Packers' 76th season in the National Football League (NFL), their 78th overall and their fifth under head coach Mike Holmgren. The franchise won its third Super Bowl and league-record 12th NFL Championship.  The Packers posted a league-best 13–3 regular season won-loss record, going 8–0 at home and 5–3 on the road. It was the first time since 1962 that the team went undefeated at home. Additionally, the Packers had the NFL's highest-scoring offense (456) and allowed the fewest points on defense (210). Green Bay was the first team to accomplish both feats in the same season since the undefeated 1972 Miami Dolphins.  They finished the season with the number one ranked offense, defense, and special teams. They also set a then NFL record for the fewest touchdowns allowed in a 16-game season, with 19. The Packers also allowed the fewest yards in the NFL and set a record for punt return yardage. Brett Favre won his second straight MVP award while also throwing for a career-high and league-leading 39 touchdown passes.

In the postseason, the Packers defeated the San Francisco 49ers in the divisional round and the Carolina Panthers in the NFC Championship Game.  Green Bay beat the New England Patriots in Super Bowl XXXI to win their third Super Bowl and twelfth NFL Championship.

In 2007, the 1996 Packers were ranked as the 16th greatest Super Bowl champions on the NFL Network's documentary series America's Game: The Super Bowl Champions.  The 1996 Packers were ranked 6th-greatest Super Bowl team of all time by a similar panel done by ESPN and released in 2007. Later, they ranked #20 on the 100 greatest teams of all time presented by the NFL on its 100th anniversary. As of 2020, the Packers are the only team since the implementation of the salary cap to score the most points and allow the fewest in the regular season.

The last remaining active member of the 1996 Green Bay Packers was quarterback Brett Favre, who retired after the 2010 season.

Offseason

NFL draft

Staff

Roster

1996 Green Bay Packers season

Preseason

Regular season

Postseason

Game summaries

Week 1: at. Tampa Bay Buccaneers

Week 5: at. Seattle Seahawks

Standings

Season statistical leaders
Brett Favre broke the Packers single-season record for touchdown passes by throwing 39.
 Passing yards: Brett Favre 3,899 yards
 Passing touchdowns: Brett Favre 39 TD
 Rushing yards: Edgar Bennett, 899 yards
 Rushing touchdowns: Dorsey Levens, 5 TD
 Receiving yards: Antonio Freeman, 933 yards
 Receiving touchdowns: Keith Jackson, 10 TD
 Points: Chris Jacke, 114 points
 Kickoff return yards: Desmond Howard, 460 yards
 Punt return yards: Desmond Howard, 875 yards
 Tackles: George Koonce, 97 tackles
 Sacks: Reggie White, 8.5 sacks
 Interceptions: Eugene Robinson, 6 interceptions

Playoffs

NFC Divisional Playoff vs. San Francisco 49ers

Green Bay was able to win going away on a cold damp day at Lambeau Field.  With the weather turning the field into a muddy mess both offenses struggled. San Francisco was able to keep pace offensively and defensively for most of the game, with the score 21–14 in favor of Green Bay in the third quarter, but special teams were decisively dominated by the Packers.  Penalties also played a factor as San Francisco had 6 for 42 yards, while Green Bay only had 1 for 5.

A muffed kickoff by Green Bay set up a 49ers touchdown, but Green Bay's Desmond Howard returned two kicks for large gains, including one touchdown. The final score was Green Bay 35–14.

NFC Championship Game vs. Carolina Panthers

Super Bowl XXXI vs. New England Patriots

The Packers win their first championship since 1967. Desmond Howard is named the Super Bowl MVP, as he accumulated 244 total yards worth of returns (kick and punt) including a 99-yard kickoff return for a touchdown in the 3rd quarter. Patriots Quarterback Drew Bledsoe threw 4 interceptions while Brett Favre threw for 246 yards and 2 touchdowns and ran another one in.

Awards and records
 Brett Favre, club record, most touchdown passes in one season, 39
 Brett Favre, NFC leader, touchdown passes (39)
 Brett Favre, NFC leader, passing yardage (3,899)
 Brett Favre, NFL MVP
 Brett Favre, Bert Bell Award
 Brett Favre, Offense, UPI NFC Player of the Year
 Brett Favre, NFC Pro Bowl selection
 Brett Favre, All-Pro selection
 Brett Favre, Best NFL Player ESPY Award
 Desmond Howard, Super Bowl XXXI MVP
 Reggie White, NFC Pro Bowl selection

References

Green Bay Packers
Green Bay Packers seasons
NFC Central championship seasons
National Football Conference championship seasons
Super Bowl champion seasons
Green